Sparganothis lycopodiana is a species of moth of the family Tortricidae. It is found in North America, including Connecticut, Maine, Maryland, New Brunswick, New Hampshire, New York, Nova Scotia, Ontario, Pennsylvania and Quebec.

The wingspan is 12–14 mm.

References

Moths described in 1907
Sparganothis